Rhamphochromis esox is a species of cichlid endemic to Lake Malawi where it prefers open waters at depths of from .  This fish is piscivore.  This species can reach a length of  SL.  It can also be found in the aquarium trade.

References

External links 
 Photograph

Esox
Taxa named by George Albert Boulenger
Fish described in 1908
Taxonomy articles created by Polbot